Tathodelta is a genus of moths of the family Erebidae. The genus was erected by George Hampson in 1893.

Species
Tathodelta aroensis Bethune-Baker, 1906 New Guinea
Tathodelta furvitincta Hampson, 1926 southern Nigeria
Tathodelta niveigutta Strand, 1920 Taiwan
Tathodelta purpurascens Hampson, 1893 India, Sri Lanka, Bali, Borneo
Tathodelta undilinea Hampson, 1926 Madagascar

References

Calpinae